Psychrolutes inermis is a species of marine ray-finned fish belonging to the family Psychrolutidae, the fatheads. This is a bathydemersal fish which is found in the eastern Atlantic from Mauritania south to the southwestern Indian Ocean from South Africa and Mozambique.

References

inermis
Fish described in 1888